The Warburton railway line just outside Melbourne, Australia, was a railway branching off from the Healesville line at the present terminus, Lilydale.

History 
The route between Lilydale and Warburton was originally proposed to be built as one of four experimental narrow gauge lines, but the recommendation was not accepted and the Warburton line opened as a  railway on Wednesday, 13 November 1901. The last train ran on Sunday, 1 August 1965, although the official closure was on 29 July 1965.

Services 
Throughout its life the Warburton line had both passenger and goods services. Although passenger services generally ran as a shuttle between Lilydale and Warburton stations), some were operated by so-called E trains, which consisted of either two electric swing-door cars (generally known as "dog boxes") or two Tait cars, hauling a number country carriages on services that ran express for most of their journey from Flinders Street station to Ringwood, except for a stop at Box Hill. At Lilydale, the country carriages were detached, and hauled by a steam locomotive to their destination at Warburton, with the reverse arrangement for the return trip.

Current status 
Although the track was dismantled in the 1970s, the Warburton line right-of-way is intact, except for a short section leased to Mount Lilydale Mercy College. All the bridges are still in place, except the one that previously crossed the Maroondah Highway. A new bridge, allowing the highway to be safely crossed by cyclists and pedestrians, was completed in 2011. The route formerly used by the line is now the Lilydale to Warburton Rail Trail, a pedestrian, bicycle and equestrian trail.

References

See also 
Lilydale to Warburton Rail Trail
The Official website Visit Warburton – Warburton Valley Community and  Economic Development Association (CEDA)
Historical Train Photos of Warburton D3 639; Electric E 1106 – WarburtonInfo.com

Closed Melbourne railway lines
Rail trails in Victoria (Australia)
5 ft 3 in gauge railways in Australia
Railway lines opened in 1901
Railway lines closed in 1965
1901 establishments in Australia
1965 disestablishments in Australia